Firemen’s Memorial is a statue located in Forest Hills Cemetery, Jamaica Plain, Boston.

Gallery

See also
 List of firefighting monuments and memorials

External links 
 Currier and Ives Prints - The Life of a Fireman (1854)
 Boston Fire Department Memorial, (sculpture). at Smithsonian Institution

References 

1909 establishments in Massachusetts
1909 sculptures
Bronze sculptures in Massachusetts
Firefighting in the United States
Firefighting memorials
Granite sculptures in Massachusetts
Monuments and memorials in Boston
Outdoor sculptures in Boston
Sculptures of men in Massachusetts
Statues in Boston
Works of John A. Wilson